The Game is a 2010 Ghanaian Nigerian thriller film directed by Frank Rajah Arase, starring Majid Michel, Yvonne Okoro and Yvonne Nelson.

Cast
Majid Michel as Teddy Elbert
John Dumelo as Ronnie Lawson
Yvonne Okoro as Brandy
Yvonne Nelson as Shennel Johnson
Beverly Afaglo as Detective
Nadia Archer Kang as Jackie Oppong
Johannes Maier as Bill
Lion De Angelo as Fred
Fred Nuamah as Jake Freeman
Ebi Bright as Letoya Benson

Reception
It got a 3 out of 5 star rating from Nollywood Reinvented who questioned the originality of the storyline, as the film seems copied from two 2008 Bollywood films; Race and Ghajini. Nollywood Forever gave it a 58% rating. While the reviewer found the cinematography to be of high quality, he found the plot too convoluted and confusing.

References

2010 films
2010 thriller drama films
Ghanaian drama films
2010 drama films
Nigerian thriller drama films
2010s English-language films
English-language Ghanaian films
English-language Nigerian films